In human anatomy, the descending aorta is part of the aorta, the largest artery in the body. The descending aorta begins at the aortic arch and runs down through the chest and abdomen. The descending aorta anatomically consists of two portions or segments, the thoracic and the abdominal aorta, in correspondence with the two great cavities of the trunk in which it is situated. Within the abdomen, the descending aorta branches into the two common iliac arteries which serve the pelvis and eventually legs.

The ductus arteriosus connects to the junction between the pulmonary artery and the descending aorta in foetal life. This artery later regresses as the ligamentum arteriosum.

See also
Abbott artery

References

External links
  – "Left side of the mediastinum."

Arteries of the thorax
Aorta